Terry and the Pirates is the title of:

 Terry and the Pirates (comic strip), the comic strip created by Milton Caniff
 Terry and the Pirates (radio serial), a radio serial based on the comic strip
 Terry and the Pirates (serial), a 1940 serial based on the comic strip
 Terry and the Pirates (TV series), a television series based on the comic strip

Fictional pirates